Clonograptus is a genus of graptolites. Groups of these animals were connected by stalklike structures to a central region. Species of Clonograptus are zone fossils, and can be used to find the precise age of Ordovician rocks.

References

Graptolite genera
Paleozoic life of New Brunswick
Paleozoic life of Newfoundland and Labrador
Paleozoic life of the Northwest Territories